Francisco Ibáñez Talavera, signing as just Ibáñez, (born 15 March 1936) is a Spanish comic book artist and writer.

Biography
Born in Barcelona, Ibáñez is the creator of several comic book series, the most famous of which is Mortadelo y Filemón.

He worked in a bank while publishing his first drawings before dedicating himself fully to his craft in 1957.  A year later, Mortadelo y Filemón appeared for the first time in the publication Pulgarcito.  Subsequently, Ibáñez created several other characters.  Since 1988, he has drawn six new Mortadelo y Filemón albums a year, many of which incorporate issues of the day.

In 1994, he received the Grand Prize of the Salón del Cómic de Barcelona and in 2001 he was awarded with the Medalla de Oro al Mérito en las Bellas Artes ("Gold Medal for Contributions to the Fine Arts"). He received the "Premios Notario del Humor" 2008 from the University of Alicante.

Works
Mortadelo y Filemón, agencia de información (1958).
La familia Trapisonda, un grupito que es la monda (1958)
13, Rue del Percebe (1961)
Godofredo y Pascualino viven del deporte fino (1961)
Ande, ríase usté con el arca de Noé (1961)
El botones Sacarino (1963)
Rompetechos (1964)
Pepe Gotera y Otilio (1966)
Chicha, Tato y Clodoveo (1986)
7, Rebolling Street (1987)
Doña Pura y Doña Pera vecinas de la escalera
Don Pedrito que está como nunca
El doctor esparadrapo y su ayudante Gazapo
Tete Cohete

References

External links
His profile in Lambiek Comiclopedia

1936 births
Living people
20th-century Spanish artists
21st-century Spanish artists
20th-century Spanish writers
21st-century Spanish writers
20th-century Spanish male writers
21st-century Spanish male writers
Spanish comics artists
Spanish comics writers
Artists from Catalonia